Altiplanos is Pierre Bensusan's sixth album, recorded between 1998 and 2004.

Track listing 
All songs by Pierre Bensusan, except Demain, dès l'Aube, by Victor Hugo and Pierre Bensusan, La Nuit des Météores Dotea Comu-Bensusan and Pierre Bensusan, Tacita Didier Malherbe and Pierre Bensusan.

"Sentimentales Pyromaniaques" – 2:41
"La Dame de Clevedon" – 5:13
"Sur un Fil" – 1:53
"Altiplanos" – 5:07
"Demain, dès l'Aube" – 5:49
"Scarabée" – 5:34
"If Only You Knew" – 3:42
"Hymn 11" – 4:30
"Long World" – 3:32
"Nefertari" – 3:58
"Sylva" – 2:29
"La Nuit des Météores" – 4:56
"Falafel à Montségur" – 7:28
"Tacita" – 3:36
"Chant de Nuit" – 2:27

Personnel
 Pierre Bensusan – guitar, vocals, double bass, udu, percussion
 Blaise Boutlefeu – djembe, flute, percussion
 Michel Benita – contrabass, clavier keyboards
 Didier Malherbe – duduk

References

2005 albums
Pierre Bensusan albums